Kaur ( (Gurmukhi),  (Shahmukhi) )  (sometimes spelled as Kour),  is a surname or a part of a personal name primarily used by the Sikh and Hindu women of Punjab region. "Kaur" is also sometimes translated as "lioness", not because this meaning is etymologically derived from the name, but as a parallel to the Sikh male name "Singh," which means "lion." "Kaur" is recognized as “Princess” or "Spiritual Princess".

It also goes back to Sanskrit word "Kumari" meaning girl or daughter, which was abridged to "Kuar" and then changed into "Kaur" by metathesis. Etymologically it derived from the Rajput term Kanwar/Kunwar or prince and was used for persons of status.

History

The tenth guru of Sikhs, Guru Gobind Singh, introduced Kaur and Singh when he administered Amrit to both male and female Sikhs; all female Sikhs were asked to use the name Kaur after their forename, and male Sikhs were to use the name Singh.

The adoption of Kaur and Singh as religious surnames was also intended to reduce caste-based prejudice. Because familial last names often signal a person's caste status (or for women who adopted their spouse's surname, the caste of their spouse), substituting Kaur and Singh allowed Sikhs to implement the Sikh religion's rejection of the caste system.

See also
 Women in Sikhism
 Singh
 Kunwar

References 

 Karamjeet kaur, History of Sikhs: 1469-1838, Vol I: Oxford University Press, 2004, page 80, footnote 14.

Sikh names
Indian surnames
Sikhism and women